Jean-Michel Izart (born 26 July 1954) is a French rower. He competed in the men's double sculls event at the 1976 Summer Olympics.

References

1954 births
Living people
French male rowers
Olympic rowers of France
Rowers at the 1976 Summer Olympics
Place of birth missing (living people)